Amar Singh Yadav is an Indian politician of Bharatiya Janata Party and a member of the Madhya Pradesh Legislative Assembly from Rajgarh constituency. In 2018 Madhya Pradesh Legislative Assembly election Yadav lost to Bapu Singh Tanwar.

References

Madhya Pradesh MLAs 2013–2018
Living people
People from Rajgarh district
Bharatiya Janata Party politicians from Madhya Pradesh
Year of birth missing (living people)